The 2019 Superettan is part of the 2019 Swedish football season, and the 19th season of Superettan, Sweden's second-tier football division in its current format. A total of 16 teams contest the league.

Teams
A total of 16 teams contest the league. The top two teams qualify directly for promotion to Allsvenskan, the third will enter a play-off for the chance of promotion.  The two bottom teams are automatically relegated, while the 13th and 14th placed teams will compete in a play-off to determine whether they are relegated.

Stadia and locations

Personnel and sponsoring
This is the last season that all teams will be obligated to have the logo of the league sponsor Svenska Spel on their jersey, as Unibet will become the main league sponsor starting in 2020. Teams are also required to wear the Superettan logo on the right sleeve of their jerseys. 

Note: Flags indicate national team as has been defined under FIFA eligibility rules. Players and Managers may hold more than one non-FIFA nationality.

League table

Playoffs
The 13th-placed and 14th-placed teams of Superettan met the two runners-up from 2019 Division 1 (Norra and Södra) in two-legged ties on a home-and-away basis with the teams from Superettan finishing at home.

Östers IF won 2–1 on aggregate and qualified for the 2020 Superettan.

 
3–3 on aggregate. Umeå FC won on away goals and qualified for the 2020 Superettan.

Positions by round

Season statistics

Top scorers

Top assists

References

External links 

 Swedish Football Association - Superettan

Superettan seasons
2019 in Swedish association football leagues
Sweden